Reverend Freeborn Garrettson Hibbard (February 22, 1811 - January 27, 1895) was an American Methodist minister, theologian, and author.

Life

His father, Reverend Billy Hibbard, was a well-known clergyman of the Methodist Episcopal Church. Freeborn entered the ministry of the same church in the New York conference at the age of eighteen, before he had completed his college course, and continued in this work chiefly in western New York from 1830 till 1856, when he was elected editor of the "Northern Christian Advocate", printed in Auburn, New York. In 1860 he resumed the pastorate and became presiding elder of the Geneva district.

Hibbard died on January 27, 1895, in Clifton Springs, New York.

Works

Dr. Hibbard's principal works are as follows:

 "Christian Baptism, its Subjects, and its Import, mode, Efficacy, and Relative Order" (New York, 1845). 
 " Palestine: its geography and Bible history" (1851). 
 "The Psalms, chronologically Arranged, with Historical Introductions, and a General Introduction to the Whole Book" (1856). 
 "The Religion of Childhood, or Children in their Relation to Native Depravity, to the Atonement, to the Family, and to the Church" (1864). 
 "Eschatology; or, The doctrine of the last things, according to the chronology and symbolism of the Apocalypse" (1890).

He also edited the "Sermons" (1869) and "Works" (1872), and published a "Biography of Bishop Leonidas L. Hamline" (1880). The "Commentary on the Psalm" (1882) in the Whedon series of "Commentaries on the Old Testament" was written by him. He also published a "History of the late East Genesee conference" (1887).

Notes

References

1811 births
1895 deaths
Methodist ministers